Networking hardware typically refers to equipment facilitating the use of a computer network. Typically, this includes routers, switches, access points, network interface cards and other related hardware. This is a list of notable vendors who produce network hardware.

Routers 

 ADTRAN
 Aerohive Networks - acquired by Extreme Networks
 Alaxala Networks
 Allied Telesis
 Alcatel Lucent Enterprise  - Stellar
 Arcadyan
 Arris International
 Aruba Networks - acquired by HPE
 Asus (including subsidiary Askey Computer Corp.)
 Avaya - acquired Nortel, networking business sold to Extreme Networks
 AVM
 Barracuda Networks
 Brocade - acquired Vyatta, purchased by Broadcom
 Billion Electric
 Calix
 Cisco Systems
 Control4 - acquired by SnapAV
 Cradlepoint - acquired by Ericsson
 Dell - acquired Force10
 Digi International
 DrayTek
 D-Link
 ECI Telecom
 Enterasys - acquired by Extreme Networks in 2013
 Ericsson - acquired Redback
 Extreme Networks
 FiberHome
 Fortinet
 HPE - acquired 3Com and Aruba Networks
 Huawei Routers
 Juniper Networks
 Linksys - acquired by Belkin
 Meraki - acquired by Cisco Systems
 MikroTik
 Mitsubishi
 Motorola
 NEC
 Netgear
 Nokia
 Nokia Networks
 Open Mesh - acquired by Datto
 RAD Data Communications
 Ribbon Communications
 Ruckus Networks - acquired by Brocade; acquired by ARRIS
 Sagemcom
 Sierra Wireless
 Silver Peak - acquired by HPE
 Technicolor
 Telco Systems
 Teltonika Networks
 TP-Link
 TRENDnet
 Ubiquiti
 USRobotics
 Xirrus - acquired by  Cambium
 Yamaha
 ZTE
 ZyXEL

Router SoC 

 Broadcom (includes former Avago and Emulex)
 Cortina Systems (including former StormSemi/StorLink)
 Geode (processor)
 HiSilicon
 Lantiq
 Mediatek (includes former TrendChip/Econet/Ralink/Airoha)
 Qualcomm (includes former Atheros)
 Realtek

Network switches 

 ADTRAN
 Aerohive
 Alaxala Networks
 Alcatel-Lucent Enterprise
 Allied Telesis
 Arista Networks
 Avaya - acquired Nortel
 Buffalo Technology
 Brocade Communications Systems - acquired Foundry Networks - was acquired by Ruckus Networks, An ARRIS company and Extreme Networks
 Ciena
 Cisco Systems
 Control4 - acquired by SnapAV
 Dell Networking
 DrayTek
 D-Link
 ECI Telecom
 EnGenius
 Enterasys - acquired by Extreme Networks
 Extreme Networks
 Fortinet
 HPE - acquired ProCurve, 3Com, H3C, TippingPoint and Aruba Networks
 Huawei
 Juniper Networks
 Linksys - acquired by Belkin
 Mellanox - acquired by NVIDIA
 Meraki - acquired by Cisco Systems
 MikroTik
 Netgear
 Nokia Networks
 NEC
 Open Mesh - acquired by Datto
 Oracle Corporation
 Rad Group
 Ruckus Networks - acquired some Brocade product lines; Ruckus was acquired by ARRIS; Arris International was acquired by CommScope
 Telco Systems
 Teledata Networks
 Teltonika Networks
 TP-Link
 TRENDnet
 Ubiquiti
 Yamaha
 ZTE
 ZyXEL

Wireless 

 ADTRAN/BlueSocket
 Aerohive
 Alaxala Networks
 Alcatel-Lucent Enterprise
 Allied Telesis
 Alvarion
 Aruba - acquired by HPE
 Asus
 Avaya
 AVM
 Belkin
 Buffalo Technology
 Ceragon
 Cisco
 CommScope
 Control4 - acquired by SnapAV
 DrayTek
 D-Link
 EnGenius
 Enterasys - acquired by Extreme
 Ericsson
 Extreme Networks
 Fortinet
 HPE
 Huawei
 Juniper - acquired Trapeze & Mist
 Linksys - acquired by Belkin
 Meraki - acquired by Cisco
 Meru - acquired by Fortinet
 MikroTik
 Motorola
 NEC
 Netgear
 Nokia Networks
 Open Mesh - acquired by Datto
 Proxim
 Ruckus Networks - acquired by Brocade; then acquired by ARRIS; then acquired by CommScope
 Siae Microelettronica
 Sierra Wireless
 Samsung
 TP-Link
 TRENDnet
 Ubiquiti
 WatchGuard
 Xirrus - acquired by Cambium Networks
 Yamaha
 ZyXEL

Wireless controller 

 Broadcom (includes former Avago and Emulex)
 Intel
 Mediatek (includes former Ralink)
 Qualcomm (includes former Atheros)
 Realtek

Network interface card 

 Allied Telesis
 Broadcom (includes former Avago and Emulex)
 Buffalo Technology
 Cavium (formerly QLogic)
 Chelsio
 Cisco
 D-Link
 Huawei
 Intel
 Marvell
 Mellanox
 Oracle Corporation
 Realtek
 TRENDnet
 ZyXEL

Ethernet controller 

 ASIX
 JMicron
 Marvell Technology
 Qualcomm (includes former Atheros)
 Realtek

Server appliance 

 aiScaler
 ApplianSys
 Avaya
 Symantec
 Cisco
 Ciena
 Exinda
 Expand
 F5
 HPE
 Infoblox
 Lanner Inc
 Lotus Foundations
 Nortel
 Oracle Corporation
 PSSC Labs
 Radware
 Riverbed Technology
 Secure64

References

Networking hardware companies